Kanaganapalle is a village in the Sri Sathya Sai district of Andhra Pradesh. It is the headquarters of a Dharmavaram revenue division mandal.

Geography 
It has an average elevation of 426 metres (1400 ft).

Demographics 
 census, Kanaganapalle had a population of 6,965. The total population constitutes 3,647 males and 3,318 females, or a sex ratio of 910 females per 1000 males. 712 children are in the age group of 0–6 years, of which 371 are boys and 341 are girls: a ratio of 919 per 1000. The average literacy rate stands at 60.05% with 3,755 literate people.

References 

Villages in Sri Sathya Sai district
Mandal headquarters in Sri Sathya Sai district